Bamunara may refer to the following villages in West Bengal, India:
 Bamunara, Paschim Bardhaman
 Bamunara, Purba Bardhaman